Internet Gateway Device (IGD) Standardized Device Control Protocol is a protocol for mapping ports in network address translation (NAT) setups, supported by some NAT-enabled routers.  It is a common communications protocol for automatically configuring port forwarding, and is part of an ISO/IEC Standard  rather than an Internet Engineering Task Force standard.

Usage 
Applications using peer-to-peer networks, multiplayer gaming, and remote assistance programs need a way to communicate through home and business gateways. Without IGD one has to manually configure the gateway to allow traffic through, a process which is error-prone and time-consuming. Universal Plug and Play (UPnP) comes with a solution for network address translation traversal (NAT traversal) that implements IGD.

IGD makes it easy to do the following:
 Learn the public (external) IP address
 Request a new public IP address
 Enumerate existing port mappings
 Add and remove port mappings
 Assign lease times to mappings

The host can allow seeking for available devices on the network via Simple Service Discovery Protocol (SSDP) which can be controlled then with the help of a network protocol such as SOAP. A seek request is sent via HTTP and port 1900 to the multicast address 239.255.255.250:
 M-SEARCH * HTTP/1.1
 Host:239.255.255.250:1900
 ST:urn:schemas-upnp-org:device:InternetGatewayDevice:1
 Man:"ssdp:discover"
 MX:3

Security risks 
Malware can exploit the IGD protocol to bring connected devices under the control of a foreign user. The Conficker worm is an example of a botnet created using this vector.

See also

 NAT Port Mapping Protocol (NAT-PMP)
 Port Control Protocol (PCP)
 Session Traversal Utilities for NAT (STUN)
 Universal Plug and Play

References

External links
 
 
 
 UPnP Forum Internet Gateway Device presentation
 Universal Plug and Play NAT Traversal FAQ by Microsoft. Archived copy
 Free, BSD-licensed ANSI C library to control a Universal Plug and Play Internet Gateway Device or NAT-PMP
 Linux implementation of an Internet gateway device server

Network protocols
Network address translation